Chris Greenwood (born July 10, 1989) is a former American football cornerback in the National Football League (NFL) for the Detroit Lions, Dallas Cowboys, Minnesota Vikings, Baltimore Ravens and New England Patriots. He played college football at Albion College.

Early years
Greenwood attended Martin Luther King High School, where he was teammates with future NFL player Nick Perry.

Greenwood enrolled at Northwood University, before transferring to Eastern Michigan University.

He enrolled at Division III Albion College for his sophomore season.

As a senior, he contributed to the team winning the conference championship. He finished his college career with 13 interceptions, including 4 returned for touchdowns.

Professional career

Detroit Lions (first stint) 
Greenwood was selected by the Detroit Lions in the fifth round (148th overall) of the 2012 NFL Draft. He suffered a torn lower abdomen muscle during OTAs in May, and was forced to begin training camp on the physically unable to perform list. The Lions kept him on the reserve/PUP list during the regular season.

On August 31, 2013, he was released and signed to the practice squad the next day.

Dallas Cowboys 
On September 25, 2013, the Dallas Cowboys signed Greenwood off the Lions' practice squad to provide depth while Morris Claiborne recovered from a shoulder injury. He was declared inactive in all the 3 games he was with the team. On October 15, he was released less than a month later when DeMarcus Ware got hurt and the Cowboys needed help on the defensive line.

Detroit Lions (second stint) 
On October 19, 2013, the Lions quickly signed Greenwood back to their practice squad after he turned down multiple practice squad offers to return to his hometown team. He played in 3 games for the Lions and made 6 tackles. He aggravated his previous injury in the last two games of the season and needed to have a second surgery in the offseason.

In 2014, Greenwood did not adjust well enough to Teryl Austin's new defensive philosophy and missed a significant part of training camp with a strained hamstring. He was released by Detroit in the final cutdowns on August 30.

Minnesota Vikings 
On September 1, 2014, The Minnesota Vikings added him to their practice squad.

Baltimore Ravens 
On December 17, 2014, He was signed to the Baltimore Ravens active roster. 

In 2015, he tore his hamstring in the third preseason game against the Washington Redskins. On August 31, he was placed on the injured reserve list. On September 2, he was released by the Ravens with an injury settlement.

New England Patriots 
On November 18, 2015, the New England Patriots signed Greenwood to their practice squad. He was released on December 10.

Winnipeg Blue Bombers 
On February 21, 2017, the Winnipeg Blue Bombers signed Greenwood to a contract. He was released on June 17.

Personal life 
Greenwood is the nephew of former NBA players, Barry Wayne Stevens & Jeff Grayer Sr.

References

External links

1989 births
Living people
Martin Luther King High School (Detroit) alumni
Players of American football from Detroit
American football cornerbacks
Eastern Michigan Eagles football players
Albion Britons football players
Detroit Lions players
Dallas Cowboys players
Minnesota Vikings players
Baltimore Ravens players
New England Patriots players
Winnipeg Blue Bombers players